Talanga FC is a South Sudanese football club located in Juba, South Sudan which currently plays in the South Sudan Football Championship.

Stadium
Currently the team plays at the 12000 capacity Juba Stadium.

Honours

Performance in CAF competitions

References

External links
Team profile
 

Football clubs in South Sudan